Jonas Lambert-Wenman (1665–1732) was a Swedish pirate. He was active as a privateer in the Caribbean in Dutch service. He came in possession of a fortune, which became the subject of a famous inheritance dispute between his nephews and nieces. The inheritance dispute came to be the subject of a novel by Carl Jonas Love Almqvist Smaragdbruden ('Emerald Bride').

References 
 Carlquist, Gunnar, red (1933). Svensk uppslagsbok. Bd 16. Malmö: Svensk Uppslagsbok AB. sid. 776

1665 births
1732 deaths
Swedish pirates
Privateers
17th-century pirates
18th-century pirates
18th-century Swedish people
People of the Swedish Empire